Ek Mon Ek Pran  is a  Dhallywood romance drama film directed by Sohanur Rahman Sohan. The film stars Shakib Khan, Apu Biswas and Toma Mirza. The film is based on a love triangle with Toma Mirza also starring opposite Khan as the second female lead. Misha Sawdagor, Afzal Sharif and Ali Raj appear in supporting roles. The film was released on April 20, 2012.

Cast
 Shakib Khan 
 Apu Biswas
 Toma Mirza
 Ali Raj
 Misha Sawdagor
 Mahmud Sazzad
 Afzal Sharif
 Don

Soundtrack
The soundtrack is composed by Shokath Ali Imon.

Track listing

References

2012 films
Bengali-language Bangladeshi films
Bangladeshi romantic drama films
Films scored by Shawkat Ali Emon
2012 romantic drama films
2010s Bengali-language films
Films directed by Sohanur Rahman Sohan